A South Dublin County Council election was held in South Dublin in Ireland on 24 May 2019 as part of that year's local elections. All 40 councillors were elected for a five-year term of office from 7 local electoral areas (LEAs) by single transferable vote.

The 2018 LEA boundary review committee replaced the LEAs used in the 2014 elections. Its terms of reference required no change in the total number of councillors but set a lower maximum LEA size of seven councillors, exceeded by two of the 2014 LEAs. Other changes were necessitated by population shifts revealed by the 2016 census.  The changes were enacted by statutory instrument (S.I.) No. 633/2018.

Results by party

Results by local electoral area

Clondalkin

Firhouse–Bohernabreena

Lucan

Palmerstown–Fonthill

Rathfarnham–Templeogue

Tallaght Central

Tallaght South

Results by gender

Changes since election
† Palmerstown-Fonthill Sinn Féin Cllr Mark Ward was elected to Dáil Éireann as a Teachta Dála (TD) for Dublin Mid-West in the by-election on 30 November 2019. On 13 January Lisa Kinsella-Colman was co-opted to South Dublin County Council to fill the vacancy.
†† Tallaght South Sinn Féin Cllr Paddy Holohan was suspended from the party on 17 January 2020 following comments he made claiming underage girls were having sex with men and then blackmailing them for money. He had previously been criticised for comments made where he made disparaging remarks about Taoiseach Varadkar's Indian heritage and said that in his opinion he was not a "family man." Holohan was later reinstated to the party after his suspension ended. In 2021, Holohan did not renew his membership of the party and became an independent. 
††† Clondalkin Fine Gael Cllr Emer Higgins was elected to Dáil Eireann in the 2020 general election as a TD for Dublin Mid-West. On 24 February 2020 Shirley O'Hara was co-opted to fill the vacancy.
†††† Firhouse-Bohernabreena Green Party Cllr Francis Noel Duffy was elected as a TD for Dublin South-West at the 2020 general election. On 24 February 2020 Clare O'Byrne was co-opted to fill the vacancy.
††††† Rathfarnam-Templeogue Fine Gael Cllr Mary Seery Kearney was nominated by the Taoiseach to the Seanad in June 2020. On 14 September, Lynn McCrave was co-opted to fill the vacancy.
†††††† Rathfarnam-Templeogue Green Party Cllr William Priestley resigned as a Cllr on 10 August having been offered a Civil Servant role in the Garda Síochána. On 14 September, Dr Laura Donaghy was co-opted to fill the vacancy.
††††††† Tallaght Central Green Party Cllr Liam Sinclair resigned from the party and became an Independent on 19 January 2021 saying “I gave it a bit of time but there was a feeling of inevitability and I made the decision to jump now rather than get in a row over something”. Sinclair later joined An Rabharta Glas, but as the party is unregistered, he sits as an independent on the council.
†††††††† Clondalkin Green Party Cllr Peter Kavanagh resigned from the party and became an Independent on 25 January 2021 saying “The party's culture had led to the toleration of personalised abuse."
††††††††† Palmerstown-Fonthill Sinn Féin Cllr Lisa Kinsella-Colman resigned as a Cllr on 21st October 2020. On 14 December 2020, Derren Ó Bradaigh was co-opted to fill the vacancy.
†††††††††† Firhouse–Bohernabreena Green Party Cllr Clare O'Byrne resigned on 8 March 2021 due to family commitments and lack of maternity leave. On 10 May 2021, Suzanne McEneaney was co-opted to fill the vacancy.
††††††††††† Tallaght South PBP/Solidarity Cllr Sandra Fay resigned on 27 April 2021 due to personal and work commitments. In June 2021, Leah Whelan was co-opted to fill the vacancy.
†††††††††††† Clondalkin independent Cllr Eoin Ó Broin joined the Social Democrats on 24 January 2022.

Footnotes

Sources

References

2019 Irish local elections
South Dublin County Council elections